The Victoria Seals were a professional baseball team based in Victoria, British Columbia.  The Seals were a member of the North Division of the independent Golden Baseball League, which is not affiliated with either Major League Baseball (MLB) or Minor League Baseball.  They joined the GBL on October 1, 2008.  The Seals played their home games at Royal Athletic Park, a multipurpose stadium in Victoria which is also used for soccer, softball and football. On November 10, 2010, team owners Russ and Darren Parker announced that the team would be ceasing operations immediately after being unable to reach an agreement with the City of Victoria on the condition of the ballpark and the instability of the Golden Baseball League.

The rights to the franchise were purchased by Westpro Productions and were going to be relocated to Fort McMurray, Alberta but that never occurred because the North American League folded.

Attendance
The Seals inaugural season boasted impressive attendance figures, with an average draw of 2,388 per game, good enough for second best in the GBL.  Furthermore, average capacity was 53%, which was the highest overall capacity total in the league. By contrast, these numbers were higher than the GBL's other Canadian teams, the Calgary Vipers and the Edmonton Capitals, in both capacity percentage and total attendance. The Seals also missed a sellout by only 19 people on their final game of the 2009 season, with 4228 fans in attendance.  They drew 10,045 fans on their final (three-game) home-stand, bringing their total attendance for 2009 to 93,691 fans.

Attendance improved in 2010 and the Seals drew 116,872 fans in 45 home dates at Royal Athletic Park. Their average attendance (2,597 per game) was third best in the ten-team league. The single-game attendance record for the franchise was set on Tuesday July 27, 2010 when 4,753 fans turned out to see Eri Yoshida pitch.

Ownership
The Seals are owned by Russ Parker and his son Darren.  Russ is the former owner of the Class AAA Pacific Coast League's Calgary Cannons (now the Albuquerque Isotopes). He is also the long-time owner of the Regina Pats hockey team of the Western Hockey League.

On-field staff
On November 25, 2008, the Seals named former MLB infielder Darrell Evans as their first manager. Before joining the Seals, Evans was the first manager of the Long Beach Armada from 2005 to 2007, and last served as batting coach for the Orange County Flyers, who won the GBL title in 2008. On March 4, 2010, Evans was fired as manager of the Seals after being discovered to have "solicited employment with another team". That team is believed to be the Palm Springs Chill of the California Winter League.

On March 8, 2010, the Seals announced the hiring of former Major League All-Star Bret Boone as their new manager. Boone is no stranger to the Pacific Northwest, having played for the nearby Seattle Mariners for several seasons during his major league career.

Joining Bret Boone in 2010 as members of the Seals' on-field staff are former major-leaguer Kip Gross as pitching coach, and second-year Seals catcher Josh Arhart, who along with regular playing duties will also serve as bench coach.

On May 27, 2010, the Seals announced that Bret Boone had resigned from his position as field manager in order to deal with a personal family issue. Boone managed the team to a 3-2 record during his short stint with the club. It was further announced that pitching coach Kip Gross took on Boone's duties as field manager. Infielder Brian Rios also took on duties as a player/coach.

Seals' demise and ownership change
On November 10, 2010, team owners Russ and Darren Parker announced that the team would be ceasing operations immediately after being unable to reach an agreement with the City of Victoria on the condition of the ballpark and the instability of the Golden Baseball League.  The GBL would later merge with the Northern League and United League Baseball to form the North American League.

Fort McMurray North American League team
On October 14, 2011, it was announced that the North American League granted Fort McMurray, Alberta, a new franchise. The ownership group, Westpro Productions, led by Craig Tkachuk (former general manager of the Edmonton Capitals), bought the rights to the original Seals franchise from the Parkers.  However, Tkachuk admitted that MacDonald Island Park would not be ready for play in 2012 and the team could start their run as strictly a road team.  The North American League has since folded,

Roster
2010 Opening day roster as of May 21, 2010

Seals players signed by Major League organizations
2009:

 Austin Bibens-Dirkx (Chicago Cubs)
 Isaac Hess (Boston Red Sox)

2010
 Sergio Pedroza (Los Angeles Dodgers)
 Chris Bodishbaugh (Chicago White Sox)
 Anthony Pluta (Los Angeles Angels)

Seals players who went on to appear in Major Leagues
2011
 Dane De La Rosa (Tampa Bay Rays) - signed by Rays after being traded away by Victoria

History of baseball in Victoria
Baseball has a long and distinguished history in the city of Victoria dating back to the mid-19th century.  Many amateur and professional teams from many different leagues have called the city their home over the years, including a New York Yankees farm team called the Victoria Athletics from 1946-51.

Past Victoria baseball teamsVictoria Baseball 1946 - 2008
Victoria Olympic Club (1866)
Victoria James Bays (1886)
Victoria Amity Club (1887)
Victoria Baseball Club (1892–1901)
Victoria Islanders (1911)
Victoria Bees (1911–1914)
Victoria Maple Leafs (1915)
Victoria Capitals (1920–1921)
Victoria Athletics (WIL) (1946–1951)
Victoria Tyees (WIL) (1952)
Victoria Mussels (NWL) (1978–1979)
Victoria Blues (NWL) (1980)
Victoria Capitals (CBL) (2003)
Victoria Royals (Pacific International League/Northwest Major League) (2004)

See also
Fort McMurray North American League team

References

External links
 Victoria Seals
 Golden Baseball League website
 Press release announcing the Seals' membership in the GBL
 Victoria Seals Baseball Blog
 Fort McMurray Professional Baseball website
 Fort McMurray Professional Baseball Facebook

Baseball teams established in 2008
Golden Baseball League teams
Defunct baseball teams in Canada
Seals
Baseball teams in British Columbia
2008 establishments in British Columbia
2010 disestablishments in British Columbia
Sports clubs disestablished in 2010
Defunct independent baseball league teams